The 1973–74 Philadelphia Flyers season was the Flyers' seventh season in the National Hockey League (NHL). The Flyers became the first expansion team to win the Stanley Cup. Prior to this season, no post-1967 expansion team had either beaten an Original Six team in a playoff round or won a Stanley Cup Final game.

Goaltender Bernie Parent, an "Original Flyer", returned to the franchise in the off-season, and the Flyers proved that the expansion teams could challenge the Original Six in 1973–74. The Bullies continued their rough-and-tumble ways, led by Dave Schultz's 348 penalty minutes, and reached the top of the West Division with a record of 50–16–12. The return of Parent proved to be of great benefit as he established himself as one of if not the best goaltender in the league by winning 47 games, a record which stood for 33 years. Since the Flyers, along with Chicago, allowed the fewest goals in the league, Parent also shared the Vezina Trophy with Chicago's Tony Esposito.

Come playoff time, the Flyers swept the Atlanta Flames in four games in the first round. In the semifinals, the Flyers faced the New York Rangers. The series, which saw the home team win every game, went seven games. The Flyers had home-ice advantage as they advanced to the Stanley Cup Finals by winning Game 7. Their opponent, Bobby Orr and the Boston Bruins, took Game 1 in Boston, but Bobby Clarke scored an overtime goal in Game 2 to even the series. The Flyers won Games 3 and 4 at home to take a 3–1 series lead, but Boston won Game 5 to stave off elimination. That set the stage for Game 6 at the Spectrum. The Flyers picked up the lead early when Rick MacLeish scored a first-period goal. Late in the game, Orr hauled down Clarke on a breakaway, a penalty which assured the Flyers of victory. Time expired as the Flyers brought the Stanley Cup to Philadelphia for the first time. Parent, having shut out Boston in Game 6, won the Conn Smythe Trophy as the Playoff MVP.

Regular season

The 1973–74 season opened on October 11, 1973, against the Toronto Maple Leafs. This was the first time Kate Smith performed "God Bless America" in person at a Flyers' game. The Flyers started strong to begin the season winning their first four games and only allowing their opponents to score three goals total while they netted 18. The Flyers were 29–11–6 heading into the All Star Game. The Flyers were represented in the All Star Game by Bobby Clarke, Bernie Parent, Ed Van Impe and Joe Watson. The Flyers finished 1st in the Western Division, seven points ahead of the second place Chicago Black Hawks.

The team was led offensively by Bobby Clarke, who led the team in goals with 35, assists with 52 and points with 87. He finished fifth among scoring leader in points. Clarke was named a 2nd Team All Stars along with defenseman Barry Ashbee. Clarke was followed by Bill Barber in goals (34), and by Rick MacLeish both in assists (45) and in points (77).

In net, the Flyers were led by goaltender Bernie Parent, who went 47–13–12, posted a 1.89 goals against average (136 goals against on 2038 shots) and 12 shutouts. Parent's 47 wins was a record until Martin Brodeur won 48 games in the 2006–07 NHL season. It remains the record for most regulation wins by a goaltender in a single season as several of Brodeur's wins came in overtime and the shootout, neither of which existed in the 1970s. Parent was a co-winner of the Vezina Trophy, which was awarded at the time to any goaltenders who played 25 or more games for the team allowing the fewest goals against, with Black Hawks' goaltender Tony Esposito.

Season standings

Playoffs
The Flyers opened the post season against the 4th place Atlanta Flames. The Flyers swept the Atlanta Flames in four games with a combined score of 17–6. Rick MacLeish led the Flyers with four goals during the series. He scored a natural hat-trick in Game 2.

The Flyers headed into a grueling semifinals match up against the New York Rangers, who had won the regular season series 2–1–2. The series opened up in Philadelphia at the Spectrum with the Flyers shutting out the Rangers 4–0 in Game 1 and taking Game 2 5–2. The series switched back to New York and the Rangers would take Game 3 5–3 and Game 4 in overtime 2–1. The Flyers won Game 5 at home 4–1. With the Rangers on the verge of defeat in Game 6 the Rangers won 4–1. In Game 7 Gary Dornhoefer scored the game-winning goal with 10:59 left in the third. Rick MacLeish again led the Flyers in scoring in this series with seven goals. The home team was the winner of every game in the series.

This set up a Stanley Cup Finals matchup against the Boston Bruins, who won the season series 3–1–1. The series opened in Boston at the Boston Garden with Boston winning Game 1, 3–2 and the Flyers winning Game 2, 3–2 in overtime on a Bobby Clarke goal. The series moved to Philadelphia where the Flyers won Game 3, 4–1 and Game 4, 4–2. The series returned to Boston and Bruins won Game 5, 5–1. The series returned to Philadelphia for Game 6. Kate Smith performed "God Bless America" to a sell out crowd of 17,007 prior to the game. The Flyers won their first Stanley Cup on the lone goal of the game by Rick MacLeish in the first period. With seconds left on the Clock Gene Hart, the Flyers play-by-play announcer, made his famous call "Ladies and gentlemen, the Flyers are going to win the Stanley Cup. The Flyers win the Stanley Cup. The Flyers win the Stanley Cup. The Flyers have won the Stanley Cup!". Bernie Parent was awarded the Conn Smythe Trophy as playoff MVP.

Schedule and results

Regular season

|- style="background:#cfc;"
| 1 || October 11 || Toronto || 0–2 || Philadelphia || Parent || 17,007 || 1–0–0 || 2 || 
|- style="background:#cfc;"
| 2 || October 13 || Philadelphia || 6–0 || NY Islanders || Parent || 13,057 || 2–0–0 || 4 || 
|- style="background:#cfc;"
| 3 || October 14 || Detroit || 2–5 || Philadelphia || Parent || 17,007 || 3–0–0 || 6 || 
|- style="background:#cfc;"
| 4 || October 17 || Philadelphia || 5–1 || California || Parent || 4,679 || 4–0–0 || 8 || 
|- style="background:#fcf;"
| 5 || October 19 || Philadelphia || 1–2 || Vancouver || Parent || 15,570 || 4–1–0 || 8 || 
|- style="background:#fcf;"
| 6 || October 20 || Philadelphia || 0–3 || Los Angeles || Parent || 11,734 || 4–2–0 || 8 || 
|- style="background:#fcf;"
| 7 || October 25 || Montreal || 4–0 || Philadelphia || Parent || 17,007 || 4–3–0 || 8 || 
|- style="background:#cfc;"
| 8 || October 27 || Philadelphia || 6–0 || Pittsburgh || Parent || 11,217 || 5–3–0 || 10 || 
|- style="background:#cfc;"
| 9 || October 28 || California || 1–2 || Philadelphia || Parent || 17,007 || 6–3–0 || 12 || 
|-

|- style="background:#cfc;"
| 10 || November 1 || Chicago || 0–1 || Philadelphia || Parent || 17,007 || 7–3–0 || 14 || 
|- style="background:#fcf;"
| 11 || November 3 || Atlanta || 2–1 || Philadelphia || Parent || 17,007 || 7–4–0 || 14 || 
|- style="background:#cfc;"
| 12 || November 4 || Pittsburgh || 0–7 || Philadelphia || Parent || 17,007 || 8–4–0 || 16 || 
|- style="background:#cfc;"
| 13 || November 7 || Philadelphia || 4–1 || Detroit || Parent || 12,509 || 9–4–0 || 18 || 
|- style="background:#fcf;"
| 14 || November 8 || Los Angeles || 3–2 || Philadelphia || Parent || 17,007 || 9–5–0 || 18 || 
|- style="background:#cfc;"
| 15 || November 11 || St. Louis || 3–4 || Philadelphia || Parent || 17,007 || 10–5–0 || 20 || 
|- style="background:#cfc;"
| 16 || November 14 || Philadelphia || 5–4 || Los Angeles || Parent || 10,045 || 11–5–0 || 22 || 
|- style="background:#cfc;"
| 17 || November 16 || Philadelphia || 2–1 || California || Parent || 6,511 || 12–5–0 || 24 || 
|- style="background:#ffc;"
| 18 || November 17 || Philadelphia || 2–2 || Vancouver || Parent || 15,570 || 12–5–1 || 25 || 
|- style="background:#fcf;"
| 19 || November 22 || Philadelphia || 2–4 || Boston || Taylor || 15,003 || 12–6–1 || 25 || 
|- style="background:#cfc;"
| 20 || November 24 || Philadelphia || 1–0 || St. Louis || Parent || 19,274 || 13–6–1 || 27 || 
|- style="background:#ffc;"
| 21 || November 29 || NY Rangers || 2–2 || Philadelphia || Parent || 17,007 || 13–6–2 || 28 || 
|-

|- style="background:#cfc;"
| 22 || December 1 || Philadelphia || 2–1 || NY Islanders || Parent || 14,865 || 14–6–2 || 30 || 
|- style="background:#cfc;"
| 23 || December 2 || California || 1–5 || Philadelphia || Parent || 17,007 || 15–6–2 || 32 || 
|- style="background:#cfc;"
| 24 || December 8 || Philadelphia || 3–1 || Toronto || Parent || 16,485 || 16–6–2 || 34 || 
|- style="background:#ffc;"
| 25 || December 9 || Boston || 3–3 || Philadelphia || Parent || 17,007 || 16–6–3 || 35 || 
|- style="background:#ffc;"
| 26 || December 12 || Philadelphia || 2–2 || Chicago || Parent || 11,000 || 16–6–4 || 36 || 
|- style="background:#fcf;"
| 27 || December 15 || Atlanta || 3–2 || Philadelphia || Parent || 17,007 || 16–7–4 || 36 || 
|- style="background:#cfc;"
| 28 || December 16 || NY Islanders || 0–4 || Philadelphia || Parent || 17,007 || 17–7–4 || 38 || 
|- style="background:#cfc;"
| 29 || December 20 || Vancouver || 3–9 || Philadelphia || Parent || 17,007 || 18–7–4 || 40 || 
|- style="background:#cfc;"
| 30 || December 22 || Chicago || 2–4 || Philadelphia || Parent || 17,007 || 19–7–4 || 42 || 
|- style="background:#fcf;"
| 31 || December 26 || Philadelphia || 1–2 || NY Rangers || Parent || 17,500 || 19–8–4 || 42 || 
|- style="background:#cfc;"
| 32 || December 29 || Philadelphia || 4–1 || St. Louis || Parent || 10,265 || 20–8–4 || 44 || 
|- style="background:#cfc;"
| 33 || December 30 || Philadelphia || 5–4 || Buffalo || Parent || 15,858 || 21–8–4 || 46 || 
|-

|- style="background:#cfc;"
| 34 || January 3 || NY Rangers || 2–4 || Philadelphia || Parent || 17,007 || 22–8–4 || 48 || 
|- style="background:#ffc;"
| 35 || January 5 || Philadelphia || 3–3 || Minnesota || Parent || 15,296 || 22–8–5 || 49 || 
|- style="background:#fcf;"
| 36 || January 7 || Philadelphia || 1–2 || Montreal || Parent || 19,040 || 22–9–5 || 49 || 
|- style="background:#cfc;"
| 37 || January 10 || Minnesota || 4–7 || Philadelphia || Parent || 17,007 || 23–9–5 || 51 || 
|- style="background:#cfc;"
| 38 || January 11 || Philadelphia || 7–6 || Atlanta || Taylor || 5,141 || 24–9–5 || 53 || 
|- style="background:#cfc;"
| 39 || January 13 || Atlanta || 0–1 || Philadelphia || Parent || 17,007 || 25–9–5 || 55 || 
|- style="background:#cfc;"
| 40 || January 17 || Buffalo || 2–7 || Philadelphia || Parent || 17,007 || 26–9–5 || 57 || 
|- style="background:#cfc;"
| 41 || January 19 || Los Angeles || 0–2 || Philadelphia || Parent || 17,007 || 27–9–5 || 59 || 
|- style="background:#fcf;"
| 42 || January 20 || Pittsburgh || 5–3 || Philadelphia || Parent || 17,007 || 27–10–5 || 59 || 
|- style="background:#cfc;"
| 43 || January 22 || Philadelphia || 3–2 || Vancouver || Taylor || 15,570 || 28–10–5 || 61 || 
|- style="background:#ffc;"
| 44 || January 24 || Philadelphia || 4–4 || Los Angeles || Parent || 14,343 || 28–10–6 || 62 || 
|- style="background:#cfc;"
| 45 || January 25 || Philadelphia || 5–0 || California || Parent || 10,776 || 29–10–6 || 64 || 
|- style="background:#fcf;"
| 46 || January 27 || Philadelphia || 3–5 || Boston || Taylor || 15,003 || 29–11–6 || 64 || 
|- style="background:#cfc;"
| 47 || January 31 || Buffalo || 3–4 || Philadelphia || Parent || 17,007 || 30–11–6 || 66 || 
|-

|- style="background:#cfc;"
| 48 || February 2 || Detroit || 2–12 || Philadelphia || Parent || 17,007 || 31–11–6 || 68 || 
|- style="background:#ffc;"
| 49 || February 3 || Philadelphia || 2–2 || Atlanta || Parent || 14,123 || 31–11–7 || 69 || 
|- style="background:#cfc;"
| 50 || February 7 || Pittsburgh || 4–5 || Philadelphia || Parent || 17,007 || 32–11–7 || 71 || 
|- style="background:#fcf;"
| 51 || February 9 || Philadelphia || 3–5 || Boston || Parent || 15,003 || 32–12–7 || 71 || 
|- style="background:#cfc;"
| 52 || February 10 || Montreal || 1–3 || Philadelphia || Parent || 17,007 || 33–12–7 || 73 || 
|- style="background:#cfc;"
| 53 || February 13 || Philadelphia || 3–1 || Toronto || Parent || 16,485 || 34–12–7 || 75 || 
|- style="background:#ffc;"
| 54 || February 14 || NY Rangers || 4–4 || Philadelphia || Parent || 17,007 || 34–12–8 || 76 || 
|- style="background:#ffc;"
| 55 || February 17 || Philadelphia || 2–2 || Montreal || Parent || 17,757 || 34–12–9 || 77 || 
|- style="background:#cfc;"
| 56 || February 20 || Philadelphia || 3–1 || Detroit || Parent || 15,128 || 35–12–9 || 79 || 
|- style="background:#fcf;"
| 57 || February 23 || Philadelphia || 1–3 || Chicago || Parent || 16,666 || 35–13–9 || 79 || 
|- style="background:#fcf;"
| 58 || February 24 || Philadelphia || 2–3 || NY Rangers || Parent || 17,500 || 35–14–9 || 79 || 
|- style="background:#ffc;"
| 59 || February 28 || Minnesota || 2–2 || Philadelphia || Parent || 17,007 || 35–14–10 || 80 || 
|-

|- style="background:#cfc;"
| 60 || March 2 || Buffalo || 2–4 || Philadelphia || Parent || 17,007 || 36–14–10 || 82 || 
|- style="background:#cfc;"
| 61 || March 3 || Montreal || 0–6 || Philadelphia || Parent || 17,007 || 37–14–10 || 84 || 
|- style="background:#cfc;"
| 62 || March 7 || Detroit || 1–6 || Philadelphia || Parent || 17,007 || 38–14–10 || 86 || 
|- style="background:#cfc;"
| 63 || March 9 || Philadelphia || 2–1 || Toronto || Parent || 16,485 || 39–14–10 || 88 || 
|- style="background:#cfc;"
| 64 || March 10 || Philadelphia || 4–3 || Buffalo || Parent || 15,858 || 40–14–10 || 90 || 
|- style="background:#cfc;"
| 65 || March 12 || Philadelphia || 2–1 || NY Islanders || Parent || 14,865 || 41–14–10 || 92 || 
|- style="background:#cfc;"
| 66 || March 14 || St. Louis || 2–4 || Philadelphia || Parent || 17,007 || 42–14–10 || 94 || 
|- style="background:#cfc;"
| 67 || March 16 || Philadelphia || 4–2 || Minnesota || Parent || 15,450 || 43–14–10 || 96 || 
|- style="background:#ffc;"
| 68 || March 17 || Toronto || 2–2 || Philadelphia || Parent || 17,007 || 43–14–11 || 97 || 
|- style="background:#cfc;"
| 69 || March 21 || Vancouver || 1–3 || Philadelphia || Parent || 17,007 || 44–14–11 || 99 || 
|- style="background:#fcf;"
| 70 || March 23 || Chicago || 3–1 || Philadelphia || Parent || 17,007 || 44–15–11 || 99 || 
|- style="background:#cfc;"
| 71 || March 24 || St. Louis || 1–4 || Philadelphia || Parent || 17,007 || 45–15–11 || 101 || 
|- style="background:#cfc;"
| 72 || March 27 || Philadelphia || 6–2 || St. Louis || Parent || 18,443 || 46–15–11 || 103 || 
|- style="background:#ffc;"
| 73 || March 28 || Philadelphia || 3–3 || Atlanta || Parent || 15,141 || 46–15–12 || 104 || 
|- style="background:#cfc;"
| 74 || March 30 || Boston || 3–5 || Philadelphia || Parent || 17,007 || 47–15–12 || 106 || 
|-

|- style="background:#cfc;"
| 75 || April 2 || Philadelphia || 6–3 || Minnesota || Taylor || 15,110 || 48–15–12 || 108 || 
|- style="background:#cfc;"
| 76 || April 4 || NY Islanders || 0–4 || Philadelphia || Parent || 17,007 || 49–15–12 || 110 || 
|- style="background:#fcf;"
| 77 || April 6 || Philadelphia || 1–6 || Pittsburgh || Taylor || 13,368 || 49–16–12 || 110 || 
|- style="background:#cfc;"
| 78 || April 7 || Minnesota || 2–6 || Philadelphia || Parent || 17,007 || 50–16–12 || 112 || 
|-

|-
| Legend:

Playoffs

|- style="background:#cfc;"
| 1 || April 9 || Atlanta || 1–4 || Philadelphia ||  || Parent || 17,007 || Flyers lead 1–0 || 
|- style="background:#cfc;"
| 2 || April 11 || Atlanta || 1–5 || Philadelphia ||  || Parent || 17,007  || Flyers lead 2–0 || 
|- style="background:#cfc;"
| 3 || April 12 || Philadelphia || 4–1 || Atlanta || || Parent || 15,141 || Flyers lead 3–0 || 
|- style="background:#cfc;"
| 4 || April 14 || Philadelphia || 4–3 || Atlanta || OT || Parent || 15,141 || Flyers win 4–0 || 
|-

|- style="background:#cfc;"
| 1 || April 20 || NY Rangers || 0–4 || Philadelphia ||  || Parent || 17,007 || Flyers lead 1–0 || 
|- style="background:#cfc;"
| 2 || April 23 || NY Rangers || 2–5 || Philadelphia ||  || Parent || 17,007  || Flyers lead 2–0 || 
|- style="background:#fcf;"
| 3 || April 25 || Philadelphia || 3–5 || NY Rangers || || Parent || 17,500 || Flyers lead 2–1 || 
|- style="background:#fcf;"
| 4 || April 28 || Philadelphia || 1–2 || NY Rangers || OT || Parent || 17,500 || Series tied 2–2 || 
|- style="background:#cfc;"
| 5 || April 30 || NY Rangers || 1–4 || Philadelphia || || Parent || 17,007 || Flyers lead 3–2 || 
|- style="background:#fcf;"
| 6 || May 2 || Philadelphia || 1–4 || NY Rangers || || Parent || 17,500 || Series tied 3–3 || 
|- style="background:#cfc;"
| 7 || May 5 || NY Rangers || 3–4 || Philadelphia || || Parent || 17,007 || Flyers win 4–3 || 
|-

|- style="background:#fcf;"
| 1 || May 7 || Philadelphia || 2–3 || Boston ||  || Parent || 15,003 || Bruins lead 1–0 || 
|- style="background:#cfc;"
| 2 || May 9 || Philadelphia || 3–2 || Boston || OT || Parent || 15,003  || Series tied 1–1 || 
|- style="background:#cfc;"
| 3 || May 12 || Boston || 1–4 || Philadelphia || || Parent || 17,007 || Flyers lead 2–1 || 
|- style="background:#cfc;"
| 4 || May 14 || Boston || 2–4 || Philadelphia ||  || Parent || 17,007 || Flyers lead 3–1 || 
|- style="background:#fcf;"
| 5 || May 16 || Philadelphia || 1–5 || Boston || || Parent || 15,003 || Flyers lead 3–2 || 
|- style="background:#cfc;"
| 6 || May 19 || Boston || 0–1 || Philadelphia || || Parent || 17,007 || Flyers win 4–2 || 
|-

|-
| Legend:

Player statistics

Scoring
 Position abbreviations: C = Center; D = Defense; G = Goaltender; LW = Left Wing; RW = Right Wing

Goaltending

Awards and records

Awards

Records

Goaltender Bernie Parent set a number of still-standing franchise records in his first season after being re-acquired. Parent set the high marks for games played by a goaltender (73), wins (47, which stood as the NHL record for 33 years), shutouts (12), minutes played (4,307), and save percentage (.932). Likewise, the team as a whole set franchise marks for fewest goals allowed (164) and shutouts (13). Parent also set two streak records. From October 11 through January 10, Parent started 37 consecutive games. During that time, he won 23 games. He also won six consecutive playoff games from April 9 to April 23.

Among other players, Bobby Clarke became the first Flyer to score two shorthanded goals in a single game on March 28, a mark which has been tied but not exceeded five times since. Dave Schultz’s 139 penalty minutes during the playoffs is a franchise high. Other playoff single year highs include Tom Bladon’s three powerplay goals by a defenseman and Rick MacLeish’s four game-winning goals, both of which have been subsequently tied twice. The team’s nine wins at home during the playoffs is tied for the franchise high.

Milestones

Franchise firsts

Individual

Transactions
The Flyers were involved in the following transactions from May 11, 1973, the day after the deciding game of the 1973 Stanley Cup Finals, through May 19, 1974, the day of the deciding game of the 1974 Stanley Cup Finals.

Trades

Players acquired

Players lost

Signings

Draft picks

Philadelphia's picks at the 1973 NHL Amateur Draft, which was held at the Mount Royal Hotel in Montreal, Quebec on May 15, 1973.

Farm teams
The Flyers were affiliated with the Richmond Robins of the AHL and the San Diego Gulls of the WHL. Rene Drolet led the Robins with 73 points and Richmond finished 4th in their division and lost in five games to the Baltimore Clippers in the first round of the playoffs. San Diego finished 3rd in the 6-team WHL's final season in existence. The Gulls also ceased operations once the Jersey Knights of the WHA moved to San Diego and became the San Diego Mariners.

Notes

References
General
 
 
 
Specific

Philadelphia
Philadelphia
Philadelphia Flyers seasons
Stanley Cup championship seasons
Philad
Philad